Armee-Abteilung Falkenhausen / Armee-Abteilung A (Army Detachment A) was an army level command of the German Army in World War I.  It served on the left (southern) wing of the Western Front throughout its existence.

History
Armee-Abteilung Falkenhausen was set up in the southern part of the Western Front in Alsace-Lorraine on 17 September 1914 from the parts of 6th Army that remained in Lorraine after it marched north to participate in the Race to the Sea.  The Staff of the dissolved Ersatz Corps under General der Infanterie Ludwig von Falkenhausen took command.  It was established as Armee-Abteilung A on 15 April 1916.  It was still in existence when the war ended, serving on the Western Front as part of Heeresgruppe Herzog Albrecht von Württemberg.

Order of Battle on formation
The following Orders of Battle illustrate the progression of the Armee-Abteilung during the war.

Order of Battle, 30 October 1918
By the end of the war, the majority of the units assigned were lower quality Reserve and Landwehr Divisions indicative of the relatively quiet sector that the Armee-Abteilung was operating in.

Commanders
Armee-Abteilung A had the following commanders during its existence:

Glossary
Armee-Abteilung or Army Detachment in the sense of "something detached from an Army".  It is not under the command of an Army so is in itself a small Army.
Armee-Gruppe or Army Group in the sense of a group within an Army and under its command, generally formed as a temporary measure for a specific task.
Heeresgruppe or Army Group in the sense of a number of armies under a single commander.

See also 

Ersatz Corps
German Army order of battle, Western Front (1918)

References

Bibliography 
 
 

A
Military units and formations of Germany in World War I
Military units and formations established in 1914
Military units and formations disestablished in 1919